Mexican Canadians are Canadian citizens of Mexican origin, either through birth or ethnicity, who reside in Canada. According to the 2021 Census, 155,380 Canadians indicated that they were of full or partial Mexican ancestry (0.42% of the country's population).

While the Mexico-origin population in Canada is relatively small, Canada has the third largest Mexican population after the United States and Mexico. Nevertheless, Canada's Mexican population is far behind that of the United States, where as of 2021 there were 37.2 million people of Mexican ancestry comprising 11.2% of the population (see Mexican Americans).

Demographics
The metropolitan areas with the largest populations of people with Mexico-related origins (2016) are: Montreal (15,195; 0.9%), Greater Toronto Area (15,160; 0.3%), Vancouver (10,965; 0.5%), Calgary (4,865; 0.4%), Edmonton (3,630; 0.3%), Ottawa (3,165; 0.3%).

Geographical extent 
While approximately 5,000 people of Mexico origins enter Canada each year as temporary students or contract workers for agriculture, these are not counted as immigrants because of their explicitly temporary legal status. Unlike the United States’ Bracero program, the temporary-worker program in Canada has various mechanisms to discourage workers from overstaying their permits. 

Migrant workers from Mexico are prevalent in Leamington, Ontario's cucumber and tomato harvesting industry. Leamington has one of the largest Mexico-born communities in Canada. There are 2,700 Mexican immigrants living in Leamington, as of 2011.

In the Okanagan Valley of British Columbia, Mexico-born labourers are employed in the wine and orchard industries.  Kelowna has a sizeable community of Mexico-born. In the summer of 2016, about 2,000 of Mexico-origin labourers were working on Okanagan Valley farms. Langley, British Columbia has a Mexican population working and/or living in town, having a Hispanic grocery store, mainly Mexican, and Central and South American products.

Statistics

See also

Canadian Mexicans
Latin American Canadians
Spanish Canadians
Canada–Mexico relations

References

+
Ethnic groups in Canada
Latin American Canadian
Mexican diaspora in North America